Kings Park Road is situated in West Perth in Western Australia. It was once known as Brooking Street. It runs as a boundary between the suburbs of West Perth and Kings Park, from the west end of Malcolm Street to the corner of Bagot Road, Subiaco and Thomas Street, West Perth.

It was bitumenised in the 1930s. In 1939, a  setback rule was suggested by the Perth City Council.  The junction with Thomas Street and Bagot Road has been modified a number of times.

The junction at the eastern end was regularly called the King's Park Circus.

The central median strip had been lined with trees, however they were removed and replaced with rose bushes some time after May 1949.

Edith Dircksey Cowan Memorial

The Edith Dircksey Cowan Memorial stands on the roundabout at the junction of Kings Park Road, Malcolm Street and Fraser Avenue in West Perth. Formerly this was the intersection of Kings Park Rd, Fraser Avenue and Mount Street, until the building of the Mitchell Freeway in 1950s, which cut Mount Street and saw the demolition of the barracks leaving behind just the Barracks Arch and the creation of Malcolm Street. Edith Cowan was the first female member of any Australian Parliament. 

Following the death of Edith Cowan in June 1932 a committee was formed to create a memorial to her. The committee initially wanted the memorial to be within Kings Park but the Kings Park Board refused to allow the memorial, saying that she was not a person of national significance. 

The committee became aware of the Perth City Council's plans for a memorial on the Kings Park Road Circus, and when approached they agreed with the memorial being designed by Harold Boas and Henry Attwell, featuring a bronze relief designed by Margaret Johnson of Mount Hawthorn, with a wreath of gum leaves and nuts. This alternative location of the memorial was also of concern at the time.

Intersections

References

Streets in West Perth, Western Australia
Kings Park, Western Australia